The 4th Toronto International Film Festival (TIFF) took place in Toronto, Ontario, Canada between September 6 and September 15, 1979. Due to overcrowding in the prior year, the Gala presentations were moved from the 700-seat Towne Cinema to the 1,600-seat Elgin Theatre. The People's Choice Award was awarded to Best Boy by Ira Wohl, which later won Oscar for Best Documentary Feature.

Awards

Programme
This year The American Nightmare retrospective on American horror films was organized by Canadian critic Robin Wood and Richard Lippe. Brian De Palma and George A. Romero attended the retrospective as guests. Also this year Industry programme trade forum was started by festival, which continued till 1991. The festival featured a special programme of films from Sweden, with Jörn Donner, the head of the Swedish Film Institute, and nine Swedish filmmakers attending.

Gala Presentations
...And Justice for All. by Norman Jewison
Black Jack by Ken Loach
Fish Hawk by Donald Shebib
The Heritage (Slægten) by Anders Refn
Legend of the Mountain by King Hu
Linus and the Mysterious Red Brick House (Linus eller Tegelhusets hemlighet) by Vilgot Sjöman
Magicians of the Silver Screen (Báječní muži s klikou) by Jiří Menzel
The Magician of Lublin by Menahem Golan
A Man, a Woman, and a Bank by Noel Black
The Marriage of Maria Braun (Die Ehe der Maria Braun) by Rainer Werner Fassbinder
The Onion Field by Harold Becker
Orchestra Rehearsal (Prova d'orchestra) by Federico Fellini
Quadrophenia by Franc Roddam
Something Short of Paradise by David Helpern
The Tempest by Derek Jarman
Time After Time by Nicholas Meyer
Us Two (À nous deux) by Claude Lelouch

Critics Choice
50/50 by Uwe Brandner
Bastien, Bastienne by Michel Andrieu
Drugstore Romance by Paul Vecchiali
Germany in Autumn (Deutschland im Herbst) by Alf Brustellin, Hans Peter Cloos, Rainer Werner Fassbinder, Alexander Kluge, Beate Mainka-Jellinghaus, Maximiliane Mainka, Edgar Reitz, Katja Rupé, Volker Schlöndorff, Peter Schubert and Bernhard Sinkel
Knife in the Head (Messer im Kopf) by Reinhard Hauff
Northern Lights by John Hanson and Rob Nilsson
To an Unknown God (A un dios desconocido) by Jaime Chávarri
To Be Sixteen (Avoir 16 ans) by Jean Pierre Lefebvre

New Directions
America's Sweetheart: The Mary Pickford Story by John Edwards
Arthur Miller on Home Ground by Harry Rasky
Blue Winter (L'hiver bleu) by André Blanchard
Radio On by Christopher Petit
The Sailor's Return by Jack Gold
Scum by Alan Clarke
Summer's Children by Julius Kohanyi
Title Shot by Les Rose

Documentaries
Best Boy by Ira Wohl
Chiefs by Richard Leacock
Chronicle of a Summer (Chronique d'un été) by Jean Rouch
The Drugstore by Joris Ivens
The Football Incident (Une histoire de ballon) by Joris Ivens
The Handmaidens of God (Les servantes du bon dieu) by Diane Létourneau
Juvenile Court by Frederick Wiseman
Juvenile Liaison by Nick Broomfield
La La, Making It in L.A. by Frank Mouris and Caroline Mouris
Les Raquetteurs by Michel Brault and Gilles Groulx
Salesman by Albert Maysles, David Maysles and Charlotte Zwerin
Solzhenitsyn's Children Are Making a Lot of Noise in Paris  by Michael Rubbo
This Will Do for Today by Martin Lavut

Special Screenings
Dinner for Adele by Oldřich Lipský
Let's Talk About Love (Parlez-nous d'amour) by Jean-Claude Lord
Molière by Ariane Mnouchkine
Stone Cold Dead by George Mendeluk
Tierra y libertad by Maurice Bulbulian

Buried Treasures
The Confessions of Amans by Gregory Nava
Faster, Pussycat! Kill! Kill! by Russ Meyer
The Friends of Eddie Coyle by Peter Yates
The Green Wall by Armando Robles Godoy
Night Moves by Arthur Penn
Ruby by Dick Bartlett
The Scenic Route by Mark Rappaport
The Super Inframan by Hua Shan
Who's That Knocking at My Door by Martin Scorsese

Swedish Cinema
The Man on the Roof (Mannen på taket) by Bo Widerberg
Men Can't Be Raped (Män kan inte våldtas) by Jörn Donner
Near and Far Away (Långt borta och nära) by Marianne Ahrne
One and One (En och en) by Erland Josephson, Sven Nykvist and Ingrid Thulin
A Respectable Life (Ett anständigt liv) by Stefan Jarl
The Score (Lyttet) by Christer Dahl
Sven Klang's Combo (Sven Klangs kvintett) by Stellan Olsson
A Walk in the Sun (En vandring i solen) by Hans Dahlberg
The Walls of Freedom (Frihetens murar) by Marianne Ahrne

German Cinema
Bye-Bye Bavaria! (Servus Bayern) by Herbert Achternbusch
The Expulsion from Paradise (Die Vertreibung aus dem Paradies) by Niklaus Schilling
 (Der Hauptdarsteller) by Reinhard Hauff
Moritz, Dear Moritz (Moritz, lieber Moritz) by Hark Bohm
On the Move (Die Abfahrer) by Adolf Winkelmann

Luce Guilbeault
A tribute program to Canadian actress and filmmaker Luce Guilbeault, featuring both films in which she performed and films she directed.

Denyse Benoît, comedienne by Luce Guilbeault
D'abord ménagères by Luce Guilbeault
Passages by Nesya Shapiro Blue
Réjeanne Padovani by Denys Arcand
Some American Feminists by Luce Guilbeault

Marguerite Duras
Films directed by Marguerite Duras.
Destroy, She Said (Détruire, dit-elle)
India Song
The Lorry (Le Camion)
La Musica
Son nom de Venise dans Calcutta désert

References

External links
 Official site
 TIFF: A Reel History: 1976 - 2012
1979 Toronto International Film Festival at IMDb

1979
1979 film festivals
1979 in Toronto
1979 in Canadian cinema